The 1907 North East Derbyshire by-election was held on 30 January 1907. The by-election was held due to the death of the incumbent Liberal MP, Thomas Bolton. It was won by the Lib-Lab candidate W. E. Harvey.

References

North East Derbyshire by-election
North East Derbyshire by-election
North East Derbyshire by-election
1900s in Derbyshire
By-elections to the Parliament of the United Kingdom in Derbyshire constituencies